Quasimodo d'El Paris is a 1999 French film that is a comedic adaptation of the 1831 novel The Hunchback of Notre Dame (Notre-Dame de Paris) by Victor Hugo.

Plot
The location is the town of El Paris. When ten-year-old boy Quasimodo shows signs of deformity, his well-to-do parents place him in the charge of the town’s mysterious evangelist, Frollo. In exchange, they adopt a Cuban girl, Esméralda, from a lower social class. Ten years later, El Paris is menaced by a serial killer, and Quasimodo is the prime suspect.

Cast
 Patrick Timsit as Quasimodo
 Richard Berry as Serge Frollo
 Mélanie Thierry as Agnès / Esméralda
 Vincent Elbaz as Phoebus
 Didier Flamand as The Governor
 Patrick Braoudé as Pierre-Grégoire
 Axelle Abbadie as The Governor's wife
 Dominique Pinon as Trouillefou
 Albert Dray as Pablo
 Doud as Diego
 François Levantal as The psychopath
 Lolo Ferrari as the fairy
 Jean-François Halin as the car driver
 Raffy Shart as the man with a hat
 Cathy Guetta as The prostitute

References

External links

 

Films based on The Hunchback of Notre-Dame
1999 comedy films
French parody films
1999 films
1990s French films